Lestar Jean (born February 5, 1988) is a former American football wide receiver. He has also played for the Minnesota Vikings and Houston Texans. He played college football at Florida Atlantic.

Professional career

Houston Texans
Jean signed with the Houston Texans as an undrafted free agent after the 2011 NFL Lockout concluded.

After spending the entire 2011 season on injured reserve due to a shoulder injury suffered in the preseason, Jean began the 2012 season as the team's fourth wide receiver. In week 13 against the Tennessee Titans, Jean caught a 54-yard pass from Matt Schaub for his first career touchdown. It was Jean's only reception of the game.

Minnesota Vikings
The Minnesota Vikings signed Jean on April 8, 2014.

Orlando Predators
On November 6, 2015, Jean was assigned to the Orlando Predators of the Arena Football League. On March 18, 2016, Jean was placed on recallable reassignment.

References

External links
Houston Texans players
Florida Atlantic Owls bio

1988 births
Living people
Miami Norland Senior High School alumni
American football wide receivers
Florida Atlantic Owls football players
Houston Texans players
Minnesota Vikings players
Orlando Predators players